Perennial Pictures Film Corporation is an independent American animated cartoon studio founded by G. Brian (Jerry) Reynolds and Russ Harris in 1979. Located in Indianapolis, Indiana, the studio made its initial entry into the marketplace producing local and regional animated television commercials. In 1982, Michael N. Ruggiero joined the studio as the third partner, and by 1984, the studio had attained its original goal and released its first animated television special, A Merry Mirthworm Christmas, to the Showtime Cable Network.

Over the years, the studio has produced many half-hour television specials, shorts, including O. Ratz - Rat in a Hot Tin Can, and a movie that have enjoyed successful telecasts on every major cable network including Nickelodeon, Cartoon Network, The Family Channel, HBO and The Disney Channel.

In 2005, the studio converted all production to digital mediums, allowing Perennial Pictures to facilitate its expansion into additional entertainment platforms. The studio’s first Flash animation production, Handycat: Bees-ness As Usual, a 7-minute short, was produced in conjunction with Frederator Studios for Nickelodeon and was part of the Random! Cartoons series that debuted in 2009.

In 2009, the studio continued development and production on new programming and web content for its "Crawford the Cat" Pre-K to 1st Grade property. Debuting internationally in 2003 on Discovery Kids UK, the "Crawford the Cat" characters were first introduced in a series of thirteen 5 minute shorts called "Crawford's Corner."

External links 
 Official website
 The Perennial Pictures Blog
 Crawford the Cat - Videos
 Crawford’s Corner - Cast and Credits
 Perennial Pictures' imdb page

American animation studios
Companies based in Indianapolis
Entertainment companies established in 1979
1979 establishments in Indiana